Aysel Ingham (née Özakın) is a Turkish-British novelist and playwright. She has written predominantly in English for over 25 years, although she has also published in three other languages (French, Turkish, and German). She also publishes under the names Ada, Anna, or Ana Ingham.

Career
Özakın was born in Şanlıurfa and studied French in Ankara and in Paris, then worked as a lecturer in Istanbul (at Atatürk Egitim Enstitusu, which is now part of Marmara University). Her literary activity was repeatedly praised by literary critics. One example of her sensitive, accurate observational prose is a 1975 Turkish language novel under the title Gurbet Yavrum, which was translated to German in 1987, under the title The Flying Carpet.

Three months after the 1980 Turkish military coup, Aysel Özakın left Turkey to attend the Berlin Literary Colloquium.

Özakin considers herself a universalist writer, whose subject matter and protagonists are increasingly international. Through her work, she has striven to cast off any stereotypical labels that would typically have been placed on her as a female author who works in a multitude of languages, and with characters set within a variety of cultural backdrops.

Personal life
She met her future husband, the English painter and sculptor Bryan Ingham, in Worpswede, Germany. Özakın moved to Cornwall, England in 1988 to escape the limitations of publishing in Germany, and married him in 1989. They lived together there until their separation in 1994, remaining on friendly terms. She has resided in England since then, and writes her works solely in English.

Bibliography 

 1975 Gurbet Yavrum (Novel); E. Publishers, Istanbul
 German edition 1987: Rowohlt, Reinbek 
 Dutch edition 1988: Ambo, Deh Baarn
 1976 	Sessiz Bir Dayanisma (Short Stories); E. Publishers, Istanbul
 1978 	Alninda Mavi Kuslar (Novel); E. Publishers, Istanbul
 1980 	Genc Kiz ve Olum (Novel); Yazko, Istanbul
 German Edition 1982, Buntbuch Verlag, Hamburg
 Dutch edition 1984; Schaloom, Amsterdam
 English edition 1988; Women's Press, London; Colorado University Press
 German edition reprinted 1989 Luchterhand, Frankfurt am Main (Germany)
 1981 	Sessiz Bir Dayanisma (Short Stories); Yazko, Istanbul
 1981  Soll Ich alt werden, German edition 1983. Buntbuch Verlag, Hamburg 
 1981  Turken in Deutschland 1984. Goldmann, München 
 Greek edition 1983. Theoria, Athens
 1984 	Die leidenschaft der anderen (Novella); Buntbuch Verlag, Hamburg
 1985	Das Lacheln des Benwubsein (Short Stories); Buntbuch Verlag, Hamburg
 Dutch edition 1986; Sjaloom, Amsterdam
 1986 	Du bist willkommen (Poems)
 1986 	Hosgeldin Dagyeli Buntbuch Verlag, Hamburg
 1987 	Zart erhob sich bis sie flog (Poems); Am Galgenberg, Hamburg; Buntbuch Verlag, Hamburg
 1987  Die Blau Vogel auf dem Stirn; Buntbuch Verlag, Hamburg 
 1988	Mavi Maske. Roman Can, Istanbull
 German edition, 1989. Luchterhand, Frankfurt
 Dutch edition 1989; Ambo Den Baarn Holland.
 1989  Selo wants to buy a house (Children book); House de Geus. Holland
 1991	Glaube Liebe Aircondition (Novel); Luchterhand ; Goldmann paperback
 1993	De taal Van de Bergen (Novel); Ambo Den Baarn Holland
 1995	Die Zunge der Berge. Luchterhand, Frankfurt 
 1997	Bartelsman (Novel)
 2000  Three Colours of Love (Three short novels, published under the name Ada Ingham); Waterloo Press, Brighton
 2004  La Langue des Montagnes; L'Esprit des Peninsules, Paris
 2007  La Voyage a travers l'oubli (poems published under the name Anna Ingham); La Soicete des Poets Francais
 2008 4 Plays of Ana Ingham
 2009  All Dreamers Go to America (Novel, published under the name Ana Ingham); Eloqent books/AEG New York. USA
 2007  Ladder in the moonlight (Novel); Pen Press, Brighton
 2009  Urgent Beauty (Novel); Eloquent Books/AEG. New York USA
 2010  Lazy Friends (Novel); Strategic Book Group. USA

Notes

Living people
1942 births
Turkish women writers
British women writers